Guitar Solos 2 is the second in a series of three albums of improvised guitar solos by various musicians. It was released in the United Kingdom by Caroline Records in 1976, and consists of two guitar solos by Fred Frith, three by Derek Bailey, three by Hans Reichel and one by G. F. Fitzgerald. Frith coordinated and produced the series, which began with his 1974 debut solo album, Guitar Solos.

The two Frith tracks on this album were later included in the 1991 CD reissue of Frith's, Guitar Solos.

Reception

In a review of Guitar Solos 2, and the next album in this series, Guitar Solos 3, Tony Coulter wrote that "[t]raditional guitar playing is most definitely not the focus of these two LPs." He called these compilations by Frith "an indispensable introduction to the world of freely improvising guitarists." Coulter added that these albums emphasize extended technique and showcase these guitarists at their best.

Track listing

Personnel
Fred Frith – guitar
G. F. Fitzgerald – guitar
Hans Reichel – guitar
Derek Bailey – guitar

References

External links

1976 albums
Experimental music albums
Free improvisation albums
Caroline Records albums
Albums produced by Fred Frith